Dhanyasi is a rāgam in Carnatic music (musical scale of South Indian classical music). It is a janya rāgam (derived scale) from the 8th melakarta scale Hanumatodi. It is a janya scale, as it does not have all the seven swaras (musical notes) in the ascending scale. It is a combination of the pentatonic scale Shuddha Dhanyasi and the sampurna raga scale Hanumatodi.

This is the common and popular scale and is used for portraying the bhakthi rasa. According to the Muthuswami Dikshitar school, there exists a scale with same name, Dhanyasi, which is derived from Natabhairavi melakarta scale, instead of Hanumatodi scale. This scale is less popular and has far less compositions set to it.

Structure and Lakshana 

Dhanyasi is an asymmetric rāgam that does not contain rishabham or dhaivatam in the ascending scale. It is an audava-sampurna rāgam (or owdava rāgam, meaning pentatonic ascending scale). Its  structure (ascending and descending scale) is as follows:

 : 
 : 

The notes used in this scale are shadjam, sadharana gandharam, shuddha madhyamam, panchamam and kaishiki nishadham in ascending scale, with shuddha dhaivatam and shuddha rishabham included in descending scale. For the details of the notations and terms, see swaras in Carnatic music.

The rāgam used by Dikshitar school of music uses chathusruti rishabham (R2) in the descending scale, in place of shuddha rishabham (R1), bringing it under the 20th melakarta Natabhairavi.

Popular compositions
There are many compositions set to Dhanyasi rāgam.

Sangeeta gnanamu, Ramabhirama Manasu and Nee chitthamu composed by Tyagaraja
Kalayami sriramam by Swati Tirunal
Chudamanikanda by Arunachala Kavi
Nammina varini by Bhadrachala Ramadas
Dasara nindisabeda by Purandara Dasa
Vani arul purivai by Papanasam Sivan
Sri Ranganathaya namasthe and Mayuranatham anisham  by Muthuswamy Dikshitar
Meenalochana brova  by Shyama Sastri
Padhavarnam – Ye maguva by mysore sadasivarayar
 Balakrishnan padamalar by pabanasamsivan

Related rāgams 
This section covers the theoretical and scientific aspect of this rāgam.

Graha Bhedam 
Salaga Bhairavi can be derived from Dhanyasi when sung from Nishadam to Nishadam.

Scale similarities 
Udayaravichandrika, also known as Shuddha Dhanyasi has a symmetric pentatonic scale, with the notes same as the ascending scale of Dhanyasi. Its  structure is S G2 M1 P N2 S : S N2 P M1 G2 S
Dhanyasi scale as per Dikshitar school uses chatusruti rishabham in descending scale in place of the shuddha rishabham. Its  structure is S G2 M1 P N2 S : S N2 D1 P M1 G2 R2 S

Notes

References

Janya ragas